"That's Just About Right" is a song written by Jeff Black and recorded by American country music band  Blackhawk. It was released in April 1995 as the fifth and final single from their self-titled debut album. It peaked at number 7 on the United States Billboard Hot Country Singles & Tracks chart, and number 9 on the Canadian RPM Country Tracks chart.

Content
In the song, the narrator talks about his friend, an artist who goes "up in the mountains...to paint the world". The artist seeks an understanding of the human condition and realizes that it's unique to each individual - or "just about right".

Critical reception
Deborah Evans Price, of Billboard magazine reviewed the song favorably, calling the bands "tight harmonies and this song's thought-provoking lyric and hook filled melody" a great combination. She goes on to say that it is a welcome sight to see an established country music group taking chances with this type of material.

Music video
The music video was directed by Jim Shea, and features Reverend Howard Finster.   It was filmed at Finster's Paradise Garden Park and Museum in Summerville, Georgia.

Chart performance
"That's Just About Right" debuted at number 70 on the U.S. Billboard Hot Country Singles & Tracks for the week of April 15, 1995.

Year-end charts

References

1994 songs
Blackhawk (band) songs
1995 singles
Arista Nashville singles
Song recordings produced by Mark Bright (record producer)